Statistics of Primera División Uruguaya for the 1990 season. It was contested by 14 teams, and Bella Vista won the championship.

League standings

References
Uruguay - List of final tables (RSSSF)

Uruguayan Primera División seasons
1990 in Uruguayan football
Uru